Homaloxestis croceata is a moth in the family Lecithoceridae. It was described by László Anthony Gozmány in 1978. It is found in China (Hebei, Jiangsu) and Korea.

The wingspan is 14–15 mm.

References

Moths described in 1978
Homaloxestis